{{DISPLAYTITLE:C15H18O3}}
The molecular formula C15H18O3 may refer to:

 Arglabin, a sesquiterpene lactone
 Irofulven, an experimental antitumor agent
 Loxoprofen, a nonsteroidal anti-inflammatory drug
 Plicatin B, a hydroxycinnamic acid
 Santonin, a drug which was widely used in the past as an anthelminthic